Gertler is a surname. Notable people with the surname include:

Adam Gertler, American television chef
André Gertler (1907–1998), Belgian classical violinist
Brie Gertler, American philosopher
Candida Gertler (born 1966/67), British/German art collector
Dan Gertler (born 1973), Israeli businessman
Greta Gertler, Australian pianist and singer
Mark Gertler (artist) (1891–1931), British painter
Mark Gertler (economist) (born 1951), American economist
Nat Gertler (born 1965), American writer
Paul Gertler, American economist
Stefan Gertler (born 1972), German singer
T. Gertler, American writer
Viktor Gertler (1901–1969), Hungarian film editor and director
Zak Gertler (born 1955/56), British/German property developer